Edmonton Catholic Separate School District No. 7 or the Edmonton Catholic School District (ECSD) is the Catholic school board in Edmonton, Alberta, Canada.

Size
The Edmonton Catholic School District currently operates 96 schools. There are a total of 1 pre-K school, 49 elementary schools, 21 elementary/junior high schools, 2 elementary/junior/senior high schools (not counting the Kisiko Awasis Kiskinhamawin in Mountain Cree Camp as the school is managed outside the ECSD main budget), 12 junior high schools, 1 junior/senior high school, 9 senior high schools (counting a 4-campus school as 1), and 1 senior high asynchronous online learning program (standalone, rather than logged in to follow along with a teacher lecturing a class in one of the physical schools).

As of the 2021–22 school year, ECSD has 43,400 students enrolled, with 4,300 staff, of which roughly 62% are certificated and 38% are classified support. The ECSD approved budget for 2021-22 is C$513.2 million.

History 

In August 1888, Edmonton Catholic parents applied to organize a separate school district for their children. In October of that same year three sisters from the Faithful Companions of Jesus sailed from France to open a convent and a school in Edmonton. They began teaching at the newly formed St. Joachim Catholic School on 2 November 1888. That first year the sisters taught 23 students. At that time compulsory schooling began at age seven and was complete by the age of 12. From that start in 1888-89, they have grown from one school with 23 students to 96 schools with more than 43,000 students in 2021-22.

Programs

Early learning
Edmonton Catholic Schools offers a pre-kindergarten program for children aged  to  called the 100 Voices program which is available at a number of different schools in the district.

Language
The Edmonton Catholic School District offers a number of language programs.

Immersion and bilingual programs 
French immersion
Ukrainian bilingual
Spanish bilingual
Polish bilingual

Language and culture programs 
Filipino
Italian
Spanish
Ukrainian
Nehiyaw Pimatisiwin Cree

Schools
As of the 2021–22 school year, ECSD has 96 schools under its jurisdiction.

In detail

See also
List of Alberta school boards
Edmonton Public Schools

References

External links
Edmonton Catholic School District

Education in Edmonton
School districts in Alberta
1888 establishments in Canada
School districts established in 1888